The TT-30, commonly known simply as the Tokarev, is an out-of-production Soviet semi-automatic pistol. It was developed in 1930 by Fedor Tokarev as a service pistol for the Soviet military to replace the Nagant M1895 revolver that had been in use since the Russian Empire, though it ended up being used in conjunction with, rather than replacing, the M1895. It served until 1952, when it was replaced by the Makarov pistol.

Development
  

In 1930, the Revolutionary Military Council approved a resolution to test new small arms to replace its aging Nagant M1895 revolvers. During these tests, on 7 January 1931, the potential of a pistol designed by Fedor Tokarev was noted. A few weeks later, 1,000 TT-30s were ordered for troop trials, and the pistol was adopted for service in the Red Army. The TT-30 was manufactured between 1930 and 1936, with about 93,000 being produced.

Even as the TT-30 was being put into production, design changes were made to simplify manufacturing. Minor changes to the barrel, disconnector, trigger and frame were implemented, the most notable ones being the omission of the removable hammer assembly and changes to the full-circumference locking lugs. This redesigned pistol was the TT-33. Most TT-33s were issued to commanding officers. The TT-33 was widely used by Soviet troops during World War II, but did not completely replace the Nagant. From 1931-1945, a total of 1,330,000 Tokarevs were produced in the Soviet Union.

Design details
Externally, the TT-33 is very similar to John Browning's blowback operated FN Model 1903 semiautomatic pistol, and internally it uses Browning's short recoil tilting-barrel system from the M1911 pistol. In other areas the TT-33 differs more from Browning's designs—it employs a much simpler hammer/sear assembly than the M1911. This assembly is removable from the pistol as a modular unit and includes machined magazine feed lips, preventing misfeeds when a damaged magazine is loaded into the magazine well. Soviet engineers made several alterations to make the mechanism easier to produce and maintain, most notably the simplifications of the barrel's locking lugs, allowing fewer machining steps. Some models use a captive recoil spring secured to the guide rod, which does depend on the barrel bushing to hold it under tension. The TT-33 is chambered for the 7.62×25mm Tokarev cartridge, which was itself based on the similar 7.63×25mm Mauser cartridge used in the Mauser C96 pistol. The 7.62×25mm cartridge is powerful, has an extremely flat trajectory, and is capable of penetrating thick clothing and soft body armor. Because of their reliability, large numbers of the TT-33 were produced during World War II and well into the 1950s. In modern times, the robust TT-33 has been converted to many powerful cartridges including .38 Super and 9×23mm Winchester. The TT-33 omitted a safety catch other than the half cock notch, which rendered the trigger inoperable until the hammer was pulled back to full cock and then lowered manually to the half cock position. Many variants imported into the US have manual safeties added, which vary greatly in placement and function.

Variants
The Wehrmacht captured TT-33s and issued them to units under the Pistole 615(r) designation. This was made possible by the fact that Russian 7.62 mm Model 1930 Type P cartridges were nearly identical to the German 7.63×25mm Mauser cartridge, although in German service the 9×19mm Parabellum round was more common. Due to much higher pressures, using Russian cartridges in German Mauser pistols can induce damages, and is advised against.

Interarms marketed World War II–surplus Russian-made Tokarevs in Europe and the United States as the Phoenix. They had new wooden grips with a phoenix design on them and were overstamped INTERARMS on the barrel. Later gun laws banned their sale due to their lack of a safety.

In 1949, a silenced variant was produced. Uniquely, the silencer is attached to the barrel bushing rather than the barrel itself. The combined weight of the suppressor with the slide prevents semi-auto cycling of the action, forcing the user to manually cycle it in the same manner as pump action firearms. It would later be replaced by the PB pistol in 1967.

Foreign production
The TT-33 was eventually replaced by the 8-round, 9×18mm Makarov PM pistol in 1952. Production of the TT-33 in Russia ended in 1954, but copies (licensed or otherwise) were also made by other countries. At one time or another, most communist or Soviet bloc countries made a variation of the TT-33 pistol.

China

The TT pistol was copied in China as the Type 51, Type 54, M20, and TU-90.

Norinco, the People's Liberation Army's state armaments manufacturer in China, manufactured a commercial variant of the Tokarev pistol chambered in the more common 9×19mm Parabellum round, known as the Tokarev Model 213, as well as in the original 7.62×25mm caliber.

The 9mm model features a safety catch, which was absent on Russian-produced TT-33 handguns. Furthermore, the Model 213 features the thin slide grip grooves, as opposed to the original Russian wide-types. The 9mm model is featured with a magazine well block mounted in the rear of the magazine well to accept 9mm type magazines without frame modification.

The Norinco model in current production is not available for sale in the United States due to import prohibitions on Chinese firearms, although older handguns of the Model 213 type imported in the 1980s and 1990s are common. 
Norinco now makes the NP-17, a modernized, two-tone variant on the Model 213.

7.62×25mm ammo is also rather inexpensive and locally produced or imported from China, also made by Norinco. The Type-54 was replaced in the mid to late 1990s by the QSZ-92 in PLA service.

Hungary

Hungary rebarreled the TT to fire 9×19mm Parabellum as the M48, as well as an export version for Egypt known as the Tokagypt 58 which was widely used by police forces there. Tokagypts differ from the original Tokarevs by an external safety lever that can be engaged in safety decocking as well as cocked hammer position. By changing the barrel and magazine into original TT parts, a calibre change system can be made easily (after proof-shooting in countries affiliated with the CIP).

Egypt, however, cancelled much of the order of the Tokagypt and PP-like pistols manufactured in Hungary; those were marketed then in the West, like the then Federal Republic of Germany, where it was imported by Hege.

North Korea
North Korea manufactured them as the Type 68 or M68.

Pakistan

Both legal and illegal TT pistols are still manufactured in various Pakistani Khyber Pass factories.

Poland
Poland produced their own copies as the PW wz.33, manufactured from 1947 to 1959.
In mid-50s a training version of PW wz. 33 was created, chambered in .22lr called TT Sportowy. All of those pistols were converted between 1954 and 1958 from the 7.62mm variant by changing the barrel and removing the locking lugs from slide.

Additionally, the Radom M48 was created in Radom, Poland as another slightly modified copy of the TT33.

Romania
Romania produced a TT-33 copy as the TTC, or Tokarev Cugir well into the 1950s. These have been made available for commercial sale in great numbers in recent years. However, to be importable into the United States, a trigger blocking safety was added.

Vietnam
The K54 is a copy of the TT-33. An updated version known as the K14-VN is made by Factory Z111, and has an increased capacity of 13 rounds, with a wider grip to incorporate a double stack magazine. Research and development started in 2001. The K14-VN began to see service with PAVN forces on May 10, 2014.

The industry name for the regular K54 and the K14-VN is known as SN7M and the SN7TD.

Yugoslavia (Serbia)

Zastava produces an improved version of the TT-33 designated M57.

The M57 has a longer grip and longer 9-round magazine (versus 8 rounds in TT). A 9×19mm version is also made by Zastava designated M70A as well as a compact version M88.

Zastava manufactures a sub compact pistol M70 (a.k.a.Pčelica ("little bee")) roughly based on TT design in 7,65mm Browning (.32 ACP) or 9mm Kratak (.380 ACP). 

Prior to 2012, the M57A, M70A and M88A were formerly imported into the U.S. by Century International Arms, but have since been replaced by Zastava USA.

Usage
The TT-33 is still in service in the Bangladeshi and North Korean armed forces today, while police in Pakistan still commonly use the TT pistol as a sidearm, though unofficially, as it is being replaced by modern 9 mm Beretta and SIG Sauer pistols. In China, the TT-33 pistol is also occasionally supplied to the People's Armed Police and People's Liberation Army under the name Type 54.

The Tokarev, as well as its variants in 9mm, have been renowned for their simplicity, power and accuracy.

Users

: Albanian police and RENEA.

: Uses Chinese Type 54 copy

 : Burundian rebels

: Used by Red Guards during Cultural Revolution and People's Liberation Army Officers. Produced in large numbers as the Type 54.

: Used by pro-Russian separatists.
 Issued in small numbers to Volkspolizei (Peoples Police) in the early 1950s, replaced by Makarov PM in late 50s.
: Produced from the 1950s.

: Captured TT-33 pistols were carried by Finnish soldiers during the Winter War (1939–1940) and Continuation War (1941–1944) with the USSR. It was nicknamed the "Star Pistol" (tähti-pistooli) due to the large Red Army star embossed on the grip panels. Although large numbers were acquired, the Finnish military never produced ammunition or spares for them because they were in a non-standard caliber.

: Produced locally.

 
 

 	
: People's Movement for the Liberation of Azawad

 Used captured pistols
: Produced locally as the Type 68.
: TT pistols are manufactured in various Pakistani Khyber Pass factories.
: Produced locally in the FB „Radom” arms factory. Used by military and law enforcement groups; replaced by the P-64 pistol in the 1960s.
: Produced locally at the Cugir factory under the designation "TTC".

: used by Vietcong and North Vietnamese Army Officers during Vietnam War
: Produced locally as the Zastava M57.

See also
List of Russian weaponry
Table of handgun and rifle cartridges

References

External links

7.62×25mm Tokarev semi-automatic pistols
9mm Parabellum semi-automatic pistols
Police weapons
Semi-automatic pistols of the Soviet Union
TT platform
Weapons and ammunition introduced in 1930
World War II infantry weapons of China
World War II infantry weapons of the Soviet Union
Cold War firearms of the Soviet Union
Tula Arms Plant products
Izhevsk Mechanical Plant products